Darren Teh  is a Singaporean professional footballer who plays as a defender for Singapore Premier League club Balestier Khalsa and the Singapore national team.

Club career

Geylang International
Darren signed with Geylang International in 2017.

Although the Eagles finished fourth in the 2017 S.League, they only retained 3 players for the 2018 season, of which Darren is one of them. 

His contract was extended for the 2019 season after another good performance in 2018.

Balestier Khalsa 
On 3 November 2021, Darren signed for Singapore Premier League side Balestier Khalsa.

International career
He was called up to the Singapore U23 team against Indonesia in March 2018  but didn't play in the match.  He played in the match against Myanmar U23 in the tune up to the Asian Games.

Darren was first called up to the national team in 2019, for the World Cup qualifiers against Yemen and Palestine on 5 September and 10 September respectively. He made his debut against Jordan, replacing Zulfahmi Arifin in the 46th minute. Darren made his first international start against Saudi Arabia for the World Cup qualifiers on October 11, 2019.

Career statistics

Club

As at 27 Feb 2022

International

Senior

U22

References

1996 births
Living people
Singaporean footballers
Singaporean sportspeople of Chinese descent
Association football midfielders
Singapore Premier League players
Singapore international footballers
Geylang International FC players